The short track speed skating events have been contested at the Universiade since 1985 as an optional sport. Starting in 1991, it has been a mandatory sport.

Events

Medalists

Men

500 m

1000 m

1500 m

3000 m

5000 m Relay

Women

500 m

1000 m

1500 m

3000 m

3000 m Relay

Medal table 
Last updated after the 2023 Winter Universiade

References 
Sports123

 
Sports at the Winter Universiade
Universiade